El Chivo, is a telenovela produced by RTI Producciones and Televisa for United States-based television network Univisión and for Colombia-based television network Caracol Television. It is an adaptation of the book La fiesta del Chivo (The Feast of the Goat) from Mario Vargas Llosa based on the history of Dominican Dictator, Rafael Trujillo. The telenovela began filming in May 2014.

Plot 
Rafael Leónidas Trujillo is a cattle thief. In a confusing event, he meets Mariana Durán, his current wife, who saved him from death. Some time later, Rafael enters the army and forges a career of several years that leads him to the rank of general. From this position, he forges a coup against the dictator at the time, Eusebio Porras. After an interim period in the governing military junta, Trujillo took power after a suspicious Dominican election that had him winning over a lot of opponents (students and guerrillas).

Cast

References 

2014 telenovelas
RTI Producciones telenovelas
Televisa telenovelas
Colombian telenovelas
Spanish-language American telenovelas
Mario Vargas Llosa